Tate Britain, known from 1897 to 1932 as the National Gallery of British Art and from 1932 to 2000 as the Tate Gallery, is an art museum on Millbank in the City of Westminster in London, England. It is part of the Tate network of galleries in England, with Tate Modern, Tate Liverpool and Tate St Ives. It is the oldest gallery in the network, having opened in 1897. It houses a substantial collection of the art of the United Kingdom since Tudor times, and in particular has large holdings of the works of J. M. W. Turner, who bequeathed all his own collection to the nation. It is one of the largest museums in the country. The museum had 525,144 visitors in 2021, an increase of 34 percent from 2020 but still well below pre- COVID-19 pandemic levels. In 2021 it ranked 50th on the list of most-visited art museums in the world.

History
The gallery is on Millbank, on the site of the former Millbank Prison. Construction, undertaken by Higgs and Hill, commenced in 1893, and the gallery opened on 21 July 1897 as the National Gallery of British Art. However, from the start it was commonly known as the Tate Gallery, after its founder Sir Henry Tate, and in 1932 it officially adopted that name. Before 2000, the gallery housed and displayed both British and modern collections, but the launch of Tate Modern saw Tate's modern collections move there, while the old Millbank gallery became dedicated to the display of historical and contemporary British art. As a consequence, it was renamed Tate Britain in March 2000.

The front part of the building was designed by Sidney R. J. Smith with a classical portico and dome behind, and the central sculpture gallery was designed by John Russell Pope. Tate Britain includes the Clore Gallery of 1987, designed by James Stirling, which houses work by J. M. W. Turner. The Clore Gallery has been regarded as an important example of Postmodern architecture, especially in the use of contextual irony: each section of the external facade quotes liberally from the building next to it in regard to materials and detailing.

Crises during its existence include flood damage to artworks from the River Thames spilling its banks, and bomb damage during World War II. However, most of the collection was in safe storage elsewhere during the war, and a large Stanley Spencer painting, deemed too big to move, had a protective brick wall built in front of it.

In 1970, the building was given Grade II* listed status.

In 2012, Tate Britain announced that it had raised the £45 million required to complete a major renovation, largely thanks to a £4.9 million grant from the Heritage Lottery Fund and £1 million given by Tate Members. The museum stayed open throughout the three phases of renovation. Completed in 2013, the newly designed sections were conceived by the architects Caruso St John and included a total of nine new galleries, with reinforced flooring to accommodate heavy sculptures. A second part was unveiled later that year, the centrepiece being the reopening of the building's Thames-facing entrance as well as a new spiral staircase beneath its rotunda. The circular balcony of the rotunda's domed atrium, closed to visitors since the 1920s, was reopened. The gallery also now has a dedicated schools' entrance and reception beneath its entrance steps on Millbank and a new archive gallery for the presentation of temporary displays.

Facilities

The front entrance is accessible by steps. A side entrance at a lower level has a ramp for wheelchair access. The gallery provides a restaurant and a café, as well as a Friends room, open only to members of the Tate. This membership is open to the public on payment of an annual subscription. As well as administration offices the building complex houses the Prints and Drawings Rooms (in the Clore galleries), as well as the Library and Archive in the Hyman Kreitman Reading Rooms. The restaurant features a mural by Rex Whistler, The Expedition in Pursuit of Rare Meats. Protests over the depiction of the enslavement of Black children and the stereotyping of Chinese figures in the mural has led to the closure of the restaurant.

Tate Britain and Tate Modern are now connected by a river bus along the River Thames, which runs from Millbank Millennium Pier immediately outside Tate Britain. The boat is decorated with spots, based on paintings of similar appearance by Damien Hirst. The lighting artwork incorporated in the pier's structure is by Angela Bulloch.

Displays
The main display spaces show the permanent collection of historic British art, as well as contemporary work. It has rooms dedicated to works by one artist, such as: Tracey Emin, John Latham, Douglas Gordon, Sam Taylor-Wood, Tacita Dean, and Marcus Gheeraerts II, though these work, such as it is with rest of the collection, are subject to rotation.

The gallery also organises career retrospectives of British artists and temporary major exhibitions of British Art. Every three years the gallery stages a Triennial exhibition in which a guest curator provides an overview of contemporary British Art. The 2003 Tate Triennial was called Days Like These. Art Now is a small changing show of a contemporary artist's work in a dedicated room.

Tate Britain is the home of the annual and usually controversial Turner Prize exhibition, featuring four artists selected by a jury chaired by the director of Tate Britain. This is spread out over the year with the four nominees announced in May, the show of their work opened in October and the prize itself given in December. Each stage of the prize generates media coverage, and there have also been a number of demonstrations against the prize, notably since 2000 an annual picket by Stuckist artists. In recent years the exhibition and award ceremony have taken place at locations other than in Tate Britain: for example, in Liverpool (2007), Derry (2013), Glasgow (2015) and Hull (2017).

Tate Britain has attempted to reach out to a different and younger audience with Late at Tate Britain on the first Friday of every month, with half-price admission to exhibitions, live music and performance art. Other public involvement has included the display of visitors', as opposed to curators', interpretation of certain artworks.

Regular free tours operate on the hour, and at 1:15 pm on Tuesday, Wednesday and Thursday short 15-minute talks are given on paintings, artists and artistic styles.

Permanent collection

Tate Britain is the national gallery of British art from 1500 to the present day. As such, it is the most comprehensive collection of its kind in the world (only the Yale Center for British Art can claim similar expansiveness, but with less depth). More recent artists include David Hockney, Peter Blake and Francis Bacon. Works in the permanent Tate collection, which may be on display at Tate Britain include:

 Unknown 17th-century artist: The Cholmondeley Ladies
 Francis Bacon: Three Studies for Figures at the Base of a Crucifixion
 William Blake: Newton
 David Bomberg: The Mud Bath
 John Constable: Flatford Mill
 Richard Dadd, The Fairy Feller's Master-Stroke
 Herbert James Draper: The Lament for Icarus
 William Dyce: Pegwell Bay, Kent – a Recollection of 5 October 1858
 Augustus Egg: Past and Present
 Thomas Gainsborough: Giovanna Baccelli
 Mark Gertler: Merry-Go-Round
 Joseph Highmore: Pamela is Married
 William Hogarth: The Painter and his Pug
 William Holman Hunt: The Awakening Conscience
 John Martin: The Great Day of His Wrath
 Henry Moore: Recumbent Figure 1938
 Sir John Everett Millais: Ophelia
 Sir Joshua Reynolds: Three Ladies Adorning a Term of hymen
 Dante Gabriel Rossetti: Ecce Ancilla Domini, Beata Beatrix
 Sir Peter Paul Rubens, Sketch for the Banqueting House Ceiling
 John Singer Sargent, Ellen Terry as Lady Macbeth
 Stanley Spencer: The Resurrection, Cookham
 George Stubbs: Horse Attacked by a Lion
 Henry Scott Tuke: August Blue
 J. M. W. Turner: The Golden Bough, Norham Castle, Sunrise
 Henry Wallis: The Death of Chatterton
 John William Waterhouse: The Lady of Shalott, The Magic Circle
 James Abbott McNeill Whistler: Symphony in White, No. 2: The Little White Girl, Nocturne: Blue and Gold – Old Battersea Bridge
 Rose Wylie: Pin Up and Porn Queen Jigsaw
 Gillian Wise: Looped Network Suspended in Pictorial Space
 Alison Wilding: Assembly
 Rachel Whiteread: Untitled (Floor/Ceiling)
 Joanna Mary Wells: Gretchen
 Paule Vézelay: Five Forms
 Annie Louisa Swynnerton: Oreads
 Helen Saunders: Monochrome Abstract Composition
 Eva Rothschild: The Fallowfield
 Bridget Riley: Achæan
 Paula Rego: War
 Fiona Rae: Maybe you can live on the moon in the next century
 Grace Pailthorpe: December 4th, 1938
 Mabel Nicholson: Family Group
 Jessica Dismorr: Abstract Composition
 Lucy McKenzie: Side Entrance
 Mary Martin (artist): Inversions
 Hilary Lloyd: One Minute of Water
 Kim Lim: Shogun
 Liliane Lijn: Headborn
 Claudette Johnson: Standing Figure with African Masks
 Gwen John: Nude Girl
 Frances Hodgkins: Flatford Mill
 Susan Hiller: Belshazzar’s Feast, the Writing on Your Wall
 Amelia Robertson Hill: Percy Bysshe Shelley
 Barbara Hepworth: Spring, 1957 (Project for Sculpture)
 Dora Gordine: Javanese Head

Gallery

Statue of Millais

When the Pre-Raphaelite painter and President of the Royal Academy, John Everett Millais, died in 1896, the Prince of Wales (later to become King Edward VII) chaired a memorial committee, which commissioned a statue of the artist. The sculpture, by Thomas Brock, was installed at the front of the gallery in the garden on the east side in 1905. On 23 November that year, The Pall Mall Gazette called it "a breezy statue, representing the man in the characteristic attitude in which we all knew him".

In 1953, Tate Director, Sir Norman Reid, attempted to have it replaced by Rodin's John the Baptist, and in 1962 again proposed its removal, calling its presence "positively harmful". His efforts were frustrated by the statue's owner, the Ministry of Works. Ownership was transferred from the Ministry to English Heritage in 1996, and by them in turn to the Tate. In 2000 the statue was removed to the rear of the building.

Transport connections

See also
 List of national galleries

Notes and references

External links

Virtual tour of the Tate Britain provided by Google Arts & Culture

Tate Britain
2000 establishments in England
Art museums and galleries in London
Art museums established in 2000
British art
Cultural infrastructure completed in 1897
Grade II* listed buildings in the City of Westminster
Grade II* listed museum buildings
Museums in the City of Westminster
Museums on the River Thames
Museums sponsored by the Department for Digital, Culture, Media and Sport
Millbank